Vicente Guerrero was the second president of independent Mexico.

Vicente Guerrero may also refer to:

Places
In Mexico;
Vicente Guerrero, Baja California, approximately 175 miles south of Tijuana
Los Algodones
Vicente Guerrero, Chihuahua
Vicente Guerrero, Durango
Vicente Guerrero, Tlaxcala
Vicente Guerrero, Puebla
Vicente Guerrero Municipality, Durango
Vicente Guerrero Municipality, Puebla

See also
Guerrero (disambiguation)